Austin Wintory (born September 9, 1984) is an American composer for film and video games. He is known for scoring the video games Flow and Journey, which made history as the only video game soundtrack to be nominated for the Grammy Award for Best Score Soundtrack for Visual Media.

Early life
Austin Wintory was born in Denver, Colorado in 1984 and started learning piano when he was ten years old, after he was introduced to composer Jerry Goldsmith by his teacher. Before the age of ten, Wintory did not play any instruments and barely listened to music. By the age of sixteen, Wintory started writing for and conducting the Cherry Creek High School Orchestra during their performances of the "Spirit of the Cosmos" pieces. Two years later, at the age of eighteen, Wintory conducted the Utah Symphony during its recording of "Cosmos", which became one of his most popular projects, although he refers to it as "atrocious garbage". Since 2003, Wintory has composed over three hundred musical scores.

Career

Beginning of game composing career and Flow 
Wintory met Jenova Chen while both attended the University of Southern California (USC). After networking with an interactive media student at USC and scoring a small game project, his name was passed along to Chen, who asked Wintory to score his thesis project, Flow, later re-released on PlayStation Network. Wintory, Chen and Nick Clarke developed the first version of Flow as a three-man team, with Wintory remarking that Chen had an incredible way of processing information, seeing far beyond code and reaching into the emotional implications of things. As a traditional orchestral student at the time, Wintory considered the music of Flow was radically unlike any he had written before. Wintory regards the pink area of the game, where the player controls a jellyfish-like creature, as the humorous area of the game, describing his music for it as almost "circus-like" compared to the overall soundtrack.

Monaco 
Originally, Monaco developer Andy Schatz sought out licensed music as a backdrop to the game's setting, feeling that the style of music needed was too esoteric to hire a composer. Wintory, however, was able to convince Schatz that he could create an original score that fit the project's vision. Likening 2D sprite-based games to the silent film era, Wintory agreed with the notion that the soundtrack to a game like Monaco should have an earnest yet self-aware nostalgic feeling, stating "There's no way to just objectively listen to that style of music without automatically being like 'This reminds me of a bygone era.'" Wintory was excited at the chance to create an old-timey score with wit and humor, stating "when else am I ever going to be asked to write anything remotely like this?"

Works

Films

Games

Awards

References

External links 

Austin Wintory on Twitter
Press and interviews of Austin Wintory
Discography at VGMdb
MobyGames rap sheet

1984 births
American film score composers
BAFTA winners (people)
Living people
American male film score composers
Musicians from Denver
USC Interactive Media & Games Division alumni
Video game composers